Ridge was a station on the Chicago Transit Authority's Niles Center branch, now known as the Yellow Line. The station was located at Ridge Avenue and Brummel Street in Evanston, Illinois. Ridge was situated east of Asbury and west of Howard. Ridge opened on March 28, 1925, and closed on March 27, 1948, upon the closing of the Niles Center branch.

References

Defunct Chicago "L" stations
Railway stations in the United States opened in 1925
Railway stations closed in 1948
1925 establishments in Illinois
1948 disestablishments in Illinois
Railway stations in Evanston, Illinois